{{DISPLAYTITLE:Eta2 Hydri}}

 

Eta2 Hydri, Latinized from η2 Hydri and often catalogued as HD 11977, is a star in the constellation of Hydrus. It is visible to the naked eye with an apparent visual magnitude of +4.68, and is one of the least variable stars known. The distance to Eta2 Hydri is approximately 222 light-years based on parallax measurements, but it is drifting closer to the Sun with a radial velocity of −18 km/s.

The stellar classification of Eta2 Hydri is G8IIIb, which indicates this is a evolved giant star. It is located in the clump zone of the HR diagram, which indicates it has already ascended the red giant branch and is now generating energy by core helium fusion surrounded by a hydrogen fusing shell. Based on its mass, it was probably a class A star (similar to Vega or Fomalhaut) when it was on the main sequence. It is estimated to be around 1.3 billion years old and has expanded to 10 times the Sun's diameter, though is only around 1.9 times as massive as the Sun. The star has a leisurely rotation, with a period of no more than 230–270 days. As of 2005, an extrasolar planet was confirmed to be orbiting the star.

Planetary system 
In 2005, the giant planet Eta2 Hydri b was found in orbit around Eta2 Hydri by measuring radial velocity variations. It is the first giant planet to be found in orbit around an intermediate-mass giant star.

See also 
 HD 11964

References

External links 
 

G-type giants
Horizontal-branch stars
Planetary systems with one confirmed planet

Hydrus (constellation)
Hydrus, eta2
Durchmusterung objects
011977
008928
0570